is a railway station in the city of  Tome, Miyagi Prefecture, Japan, operated by East Japan Railway Company (JR East).

Lines
Umegasawa Station is served by the Tōhoku Main Line, and is located 411.5 rail kilometers from the official starting point of the line at Tokyo Station.

Station layout
Umegasawa Station has two opposed side platforms connected to the station building by on overhead passageway. The station is unattended.

Platforms

History
Umegasawa Station opened on March 2, 1953. The station was absorbed into the JR East network upon the privatization of the Japanese National Railways (JNR) on April 1, 1987.

See also
 List of Railway Stations in Japan

External links

  

Railway stations in Miyagi Prefecture
Tōhoku Main Line
Railway stations in Japan opened in 1953
Tome, Miyagi
Stations of East Japan Railway Company